Lovers of Haeundae is a 2012 South Korean television series about a prosecutor who goes undercover to infiltrate a crime family in Haeundae, Busan, and after losing his memory, falls in love with the daughter of a mob boss.

Plot
Newly wed public prosecutor, Lee Tae-sung, goes undercover in pursuit of a gangster in Haeundae, Busan, attacked by his quarry and thrown into the sea, he loses his memory of who he was. Homeless and alone in the world he is taken in by the family of a deposed crime boss, who believe him to be his cover, a body builder and performer in a night club revue, who came to Busan after falling in love with Go So-ra, the daughter of the crime boss. Despite misunderstandings and bickering, Lee and Go marry and the two fall in love for real. However, after he recovers his memory, he stands at a crossroads and has to decide which of his wives he will stay with; the one he married out of duty and who can help him in his career, or the one he loves.

Cast

Ratings

Awards and nominations

References

External links
  
 
 

2012 South Korean television series debuts
2012 South Korean television series endings
Korean Broadcasting System television dramas
Korean-language television shows
South Korean romantic comedy television series
South Korean action television series
Television shows set in Busan